The 1973–74 Soviet Championship League season was the 28th season of the Soviet Championship League, the top level of ice hockey in the Soviet Union. Nine teams participated in the league, and Krylya Sovetov Moscow won the championship.

Regular season

Relegation 
 Avtomobilist Sverdlovsk – SKA Leningrad 4:7, 2:9

External links
Season on hockeystars.ru

1973–74 in Soviet ice hockey
Soviet League seasons
Sov